Miguel García Onsalo (20 June 1897 – 1921) was a Spanish sprinter. He competed in the men's 400 metres at the 1920 Summer Olympics.

References

1897 births
1921 deaths
Athletes (track and field) at the 1920 Summer Olympics
Spanish male sprinters
Spanish male middle-distance runners
Olympic athletes of Spain
Place of birth missing